Loriol-du-Comtat is a commune in the Vaucluse department in the Provence-Alpes-Côte d'Azur region in Southeastern France. In 2019, it had a population of 2,520.

See also
Communes of the Vaucluse department

References

Communes of Vaucluse